The 2020–21 Serie A (women) is the 54th season of the women's football top level league in Italy. It began on 23 August 2020 and is scheduled to be concluded on 23 May 2021.  
Juventus are the defending champions, after being crowned league winners as the previous season could not be completed due to the COVID-19 pandemic. They won the competition for fourth consecutive season, equalling the feat reached by Torres in 2013. The Bianconere became the ninth in the Italian women's top flight to won the competition unbeaten, equalling the result achieved the previous season, becoming also the third to reach it in consecutive seasons and the first to accomplish a perfect season having won all their league matches, being the latter an unprecedented feat in Italian men's or women's football history. Consequently, the club holds the record for the most points in a championship with 12 teams contestants (66).

Teams

Stadiums and locations

League table

Match results

Positions by round

Season's statistics

Topscorers

Assists

References

External links

Official Website

2020–21 domestic women's association football leagues
2020-21
Women